The 2019 Carolina Challenge Cup was the 15th edition of the Carolina Challenge Cup, an annual soccer tournament held in Charleston, South Carolina by the Charleston Battery. The tournament ran from February 16 to 23, with all matches played at MUSC Health Stadium in Charleston.

In addition to the Charleston Battery of the USL Championship (USL), three Major League Soccer (MLS) clubs participated: Columbus Crew, Chicago Fire, and FC Cincinnati, all of Major League Soccer.

Teams

Cup matches 
All times are Eastern Standard Time (UTC-05:00)

Table standings

(C) – Cup Winner

Top goalscorers

References 

2019
2019 in American soccer
2019 in sports in South Carolina
February 2019 sports events in the United States